Benjamin Trinks (born 15 October 1990) is a German actor and a voice actor.

Biography 
Benjamin Trinks was born in Berlin. At the age of eight Benjamin Trinks was admitted to the child ensemble at the Friedrichstadt-Palast in Berlin where he made his first experiences on stage taking part in various revues. After appearing in music clips for Michael Schanze's variety shows, he came to the attention of TV executives. In 2004 he appeared in his first major television role in the ZDF series "Sabine". Shortly after roles followed in TV shows like "ZACK" (Sat.1) and "Krimi.de" (KI.KA).

Early in 2007, Trinks played Warrenville in the radio play "a pact, a kiss and softy knee". At the same time he was filming the boarding school series "Schloss Einstein" as Nick, before appearing in the second series of Disney's "Kurze Pause" in April. The third series was shot during the summer of the same year. In addition, Trinks took part in an on-camera master class with Nancy Bishop, a US casting director. He also had a part in the Berlin edition of "Tatort" and the television series "Die Stein".

On 29 November 2007, Trinks was the interview guest of Italian theatre star and singer Mafy on the Italian radio station "radiosound 95". Both appeared in the sitcom "Kurze Pause" in their respective countries. Preciously they had cooperated by presenting the live feed from the London premier of High School Musical 2.

Trinks was cast in the film "The Reader", also starring Ralph Fiennes and Kate Winslet. He also appeared in the short film "Teacher".

Filmography 
2001: Clips with Michael Schanze
2001: Volkstümliche Hitparade
2003: Spot für Toleranz
2004: Krimi.de
2004: Lucky Punch
2004: Sabine
2004: Wo bleibst du Baby?
2004: ZACK
2005: ZACK
2006: Disneys Kurze Pause
2006: Unser Charly
2006: Disney Christmas Song Winterwunderzeit
2006: LEO - Ein fast perfekter Typ
2007: Disneys Kurze Pause 2
2007: Schloss Einstein
2007: Tatort
2007: High School Musical 2 - Premiere in London
2007: Disneys Kurze Pause 3
2007: Die Stein
2007: Lehrer (AT)
 2008: Disney Channel Games - Florida
 2008: Ich liebe den Mann meiner besten Freundin
 2008: Camp Rock - We Rock 
 2009: Draußen am See
 2009: Die Wette
 2009: Familie Dr. Kleist
 2009: The Reader
 2009: Fairfield
 2009: Vater, bin ich Kind?
 2009: Allein unter Schülern
 2010: Rauchfrei 
 2010: zaOza - Lass dich nicht ausbeuten
 2010: Ampelmann
 2011: Schicksalsjahre
 2011: The Old Fox (Der Alte)- Der Tod und das Mädchen
 2011: Der gestohlene Sommer
 2012: Und alle haben geschwiegen
 2012: Notruf Hafenkante - Unzertrennlich 
 2012: Terra X - Die Seefahrer der Bounty
 2012: Mord in Ludwigslust
 2013: Unsere Mütter, unsere Väter 
 2014: Ein Fall von Liebe - Annas Baby
 2014: SOKO Wismar - Neptuns Rache
 2014: Kripo Holstein - Bömmel kloppen
 2014: Gut Molzow

Synchronous work 
2003: The Village; Rolle: Junge
2004: Hitler in Colour; Rolle: Wolfgang Findeisen
2005: Familie Dr. Kleist; Rolle: Jacob
2005: Krimi.de; Teil 3 Rolle: Rocky
2006: Disneys Weihnachtssong
2006: Titelsong Disneys Kurze Pause
2007: Ein Pakt, ein Kuss und weiche Knie; Rolle: Warrenville
2007: Ferrero Fernsehspot Surprise Visit Rolle: Gastgeber

External links 

 Official Website of Benjamin Trinks
 

1990 births
Living people
German male child actors
German male stage actors
German male television actors